Dmytro Valeriyovych Chernysh (born 1 April 1998) is a Ukrainian professional footballer who plays as a goalkeeper.

References

External links
 Profile on Lyubomyr Stavyshche official website
 
 

1998 births
Living people
Sportspeople from Kryvyi Rih
Ukrainian footballers
Association football goalkeepers
FC Hirnyk Kryvyi Rih players
FC Oleksandriya players
FC Poltava players
FC Inhulets-2 Petrove players
FC Kryvbas Kryvyi Rih players
FC Lyubomyr Stavyshche players
Ukrainian Second League players
Ukrainian Amateur Football Championship players